Sophie Ulrike Koch (born 4 October 1997) is a German sprint canoer. 

She qualified at the 2020 Summer Olympics, in the C-1 200 meters, and C-2 500 meters. 

She competed at the 2018 ICF Canoe Sprint World Championships, and at the 2021 Canoe Sprint World Cup.

References

External links
Profile
 

1997 births
Living people
German female canoeists
Olympic canoeists of Germany
Canoeists at the 2020 Summer Olympics
ICF Canoe Sprint World Championships medalists in Canadian